Khedoi is large village located 14 km from the town of Anjar and the taluka of Kutch district in the Indian state of Gujarat. The village is sub-divided into Nani-Khedoi and Moti-Khedoi. It has a primary health centre and a major electricity processing plant. The main occupation of the villagers is agriculture.

History
Khedoi is one of the 19 villages founded by Kutch Gurjar Kshatriyas, who first moved to Saurashtra in the early 7th century. A major group entered Kutch in the 12th century and established themselves at Dhaneti. From the 12th century onwards they moved to settle themselves between Anjar and Bhuj and founded the villages of Anjar, Sinugra, Khambhra, Nagalpar, Khedoi, Madhapar, Hajapar, Kukma, Galpadar, Reha, Vidi, Ratnal, Jambudi, Devaliya, Lovaria, Nagor, Chandiya, Meghpar and Kumbharia.

All the old houses, temples, entrance gates and chabutro, were erected by this Kshatriya community in its heyday in the decades of 1890-1900. However, the majority of old houses built by the artisan Mestri community with their unique architecture were destroyed in the earthquake of 26 January 2001. Khedoi was home to many Gaidher, who belonged to Mestri community bearing Rathod surname

Present status
The Darbar, Jadeja, Rabari, Ahirs, Patels and, goswami dominate the village population, whereas the Kutch Gurjar Kshatriyas community who founded the village in 1450 AD are very few.

Temples
There are temples of Momay Ma, Champal Ma, Amba Ma, Shiv Mandir, Thakor Mandir and Kuldevi. Temples of many clans of these Kutch Gurjar Kshatriya community are also in this village.

Economy
The village of Khedoi now houses a well-known and prominent sector of manufacturing industry. The factory of Man Industries Limited, manufacturing steel pipes, is located on the outskirts of the village. The economy of the village depends heavily on farming. The soil surrounding the village is fertile and has farms growing mango, guava, pomegranate and other fruits and vegetable.

References

Villages in Kutch district